Kao Hua-chu (born 2 October 1946) is a retired Republic of China Army general and the incumbent Secretary-General of the National Security Council of the Republic of China. He was the Minister of National Defense that appointed to the post by then Premier-designate Wu Den-yih on 9 September 2009. On 29 July 2013, Kao resigned from his post due to the death scandal of Corporal Hung Chung-chiu of the Republic of China Army during his conscription on 4 July 2013.

Early life

1974 Army helicopter crash

In 1974, Kao was involved in a helicopter crash in Taoyuan County (now Taoyuan City) with his colleagues, including Yu Hao-chang, the then-Commanding General of Army Command Headquarters. The accident involved two UH-1H helicopters crashed due to bad weather. It killed than 20 people and seriously injuring Kao, yet he still managed to carry Yu on his back while looking for help.

2009 Typhoon Morakot

A month after Typhoon Morakot brought the worst flooding and mudslides to Taiwan in 50 years, Kao was appointed as the leading deputy executive officer of the Morakot Post-Disaster Reconstruction Council of the Executive Yuan.

ROC Minister of National Defense

2013 Korean crisis

Amidst the ongoing 2013 North Korean crisis, in mid April 2013 Kao said that the ROC Armed Forces is capable of intercepting missiles from North Korea and it doesn't pose any threat to Taiwan because the chance for Taiwan to be accidentally hit by the missiles is low. He further added that long-range radar installation in Hsinchu County could always detect any incoming missiles fired by North Korea before.

Dadan Island and Erdan Island demilitarization

Kao said that once ROC two outlying islands Dadan Island and Erdan Island have been demilitarized and are open to public within three years, he hoped that the Coast Guard Administration and other law enforcement agencies can take over the security for both islands. Currently those two islands are off to public due to its extremely close proximity (7 nautical miles) to PRC area, the coast of Xiamen.

Taiwanese fisherman shooting incident

After the shooting incident of Taiwanese fisherman by Philippine government vessel on 9 May 2013 at the disputed water in South China Sea, on May 11, 2013, Kao held a meeting with ROC President Ma Ying-jeou and ROC Minister of Foreign Affairs David Lin at the Presidential Office Building in Taipei in which the ROC government gave 72 hours for the Philippine government to give formal apology and bring those responsible for the shooting to justice, if not Taiwan will freeze Philippine worker applications, recall ROC representative to the Philippines back to Taiwan and ask the Philippine representative in Taiwan back to the Philippines.

Two ROC Air Force fighter aircraft crash
After the two incident involving two of ROC Air Force fighter aircraft in mid of May 2013 within five days apart involving an F-16 and Mirage 2000-5, Kao apologized to the public but asking their support for the moral of the pilots involved in the incident. He assured the public that all remaining aircraft in duty are all in good condition, and that the two crashes didn't compromise Taiwan's air defense.

ROC NSC Secretary-General

2015 Ma-Xi Meeting 

The ROC Presidential Office stated that the intention of President Ma for this meeting is to consolidate peace and maintain the status quo. President Ma will be joined by Presidential Office Secretary-General Tseng Yung-chuan and Deputy Secretary-General Hsiao Hsu-tsen (蕭旭岑), National Security Council Secretary-General Kao Hua-chu and advisor Chiu Kun-Shuan, MAC Minister Andrew Hsia and Deputy Minister Wu Mei-hung.

See also

 Republic of China Armed Forces
 Veterans Affairs Commission

References

Taiwanese Ministers of National Defense
Living people
1946 births
Republic of China politicians from Shandong
Politicians from Qingdao
Kuomintang politicians in Taiwan
Taiwanese Ministers of the Veterans Affairs Council
Taiwanese people from Shandong
Survivors of aviation accidents or incidents